Gunnar Wennerberg (2 October 1817 – 24 August 1901) was a Swedish poet, composer and politician.

Biography
Wennerberg was the son of the vicar of the town of Lidköping in Västergötland, went to gymnasium in the cathedral town of Skara, and matriculated as a student at Uppsala University in 1837, where he studied natural sciences, Classical philology, Philosophy and Aesthetics. He received his filosofie magister degree in 1845 and became a docent of Aesthetics in 1846.

Wennerberg was remarkable in several ways, handsome in face and tall in figure, with a finely trained singing voice, and brilliant in wit and conversation. From the outset of his career he was accepted in the inner circle of men of light and leading for which the university was at that time famous. In 1843 he became a member of the musical club who called themselves The Juvenals, and for their meetings were written the trios and duets, music and words, which Wennerberg began to publish in 1846. In the following year appeared the earliest numbers of Gluntarne (or "The Boys"), thirty duets for baritone and bass, which continued to be issued from 1847 to 1850. The success of these remarkable productions, masterpieces in two arts, was overwhelming: they presented an epitome of all that was most unusual and most attractive in the curious university life of Sweden.

 
In the second volume of his collected works Wennerberg gave, long afterwards, a very interesting account of the inception and history of these celebrated duets. His great personal popularity, as the representative Swedish student, did not prevent him, however, from pursuing his studies, and he became an authority on Spinoza. In 1850 he first travelled through Sweden, singing and reciting in public, and his tour was a long popular triumph. In 1860 he published his collected trios, as De tre ("The Three"). In 1865, at the particular wish of the king, Charles XV, Wennerberg entered official life in the department of elementary education.

Wennerberg succeeded Christian Eric Fahlcrantz in 1866 as one of the eighteen of the Swedish Academy, and in 1870 became minister of education and ecclesiastical affairs in the cabinet of Axel Gustaf Adlercreutz, upon the fall of which in 1875 he retired for a time into private life. He was, however, made governor (landshövding) of Kronoberg County, and shortly afterward was elected to represent it in the Riksdag. His active parliamentary life continued until he was nearly eighty years of age. In 1881 and 1885 he issued his collected works, mainly in verse. He was yet again appointed minister of education and ecclesiastical affairs, for a second and final time in 1888,  and served in office to 1891. After his resignation as a cabinet minister, he was then elected to the upper house of the Riksdag in 1893.

Wennerberg preserved his superb appearance in advanced old age, and he died, after a very short illness, on 24 August 1901, at Läckö Castle, where he was visiting his brother-in-law, Count Axel Rudenschöld. His wife, the Countess Hedvig Cronstedt, whom he married in 1852, died in 1900. Wennerberg was a most remarkable type of the lyrical, ardent Swedish aristocrat, full of the joy of life and the beauty of it. In the long roll of his eighty-four years there was scarcely a crumpled rose-leaf. His poems, to which their musical accompaniment is almost essential, have not ceased, in half a century, to be universally pleasing to Swedish ears; outside Sweden it would be difficult to make their peculiarly local charm intelligible.

Relatives
Wennerberg's niece Sara Wennerberg-Reuter (1875–1959) was also a well-known musician; she was an organist and composer. His younger brother, Gunnar Brynolf Wennerberg was an artist.

References

External links

Gunnar Wennerberg  at HymnTime.
Gunnar Wennerberg on Victor Records. 

Swedish Wikisource
Gunnar Wennerborg 01
Gunnar Wennerborg 02
Gunnar Wennerberg statue by Carl Johan Eldh
Wennerberg 01  at Minnehaha Park in Minneapolis.
Wennerberg 02  at Minnehaha Park in Minneapolis. 
Wennerberg 03 at Djurgården Park in Stockholm, Sweden.
Historic photos
Gunnar Wennerberg at Wikimedia Commons.
Gunnar Wennerberg at the Hennepin County Library.
Gunnar Wennerberg at the Minnesota Historical Society.
Poem
O God, Who guid'st the fate of nations: lyrics by Gunnar Wennerberg.
Video
 words and music by Gunnar Wennerberg.
Streaming audio
Gunnar Wennerberg on Edison Records.

1817 births
1901 deaths
19th-century classical composers
19th-century Swedish people
Governors of Kronoberg County
Members of the Swedish Academy
Members of the Första kammaren
People from Lidköping Municipality
Romantic composers
Swedish classical composers
Swedish male classical composers
Swedish-language writers
Swedish Ministers of Education and Ecclesiastical Affairs
Swedish poets
Swedish male writers
Uppsala University alumni
Swedish male poets
19th-century Swedish poets
Musicians from Uppsala
19th-century male writers
19th-century Swedish musicians
20th-century Swedish male musicians
20th-century Swedish musicians
19th-century male musicians